Siebenhirten  is a station on  of the Vienna U-Bahn. It is located in the Liesing District. It opened on 15 April 1995 as the souther terminus of the extension of the line from  Philadelphiabrücke.

References

External links

Buildings and structures in Liesing
Railway stations opened in 1995
1995 establishments in Austria
Vienna U-Bahn stations
Railway stations in Austria opened in the 20th century